Wesley Brown may refer to:

Wes Brown (born 1979), English football player
Wesley A. Brown (1927–2012), first African-American to graduate from the U.S. Naval Academy
Wesley E. Brown (1907–2012), U.S. District Court judge and oldest federal judge in American history at the time of his death
Wesley Brown (writer), American writer